Xuwen County (postal: Tsuimen or Suwen) is a county in the southwest of Guangdong Province, China. It is under the administration of Zhanjiang city.

Geography
Xuwen County is the southernmost county of Guangdong Province, at the southern end of the Leizhou Peninsula. Coastline is 372 kilometers.

History
In Yuanding VI, Han Dynasty (111.B.C.), the county was established, capital was in the rear of islets, integrated with Shiwei, Erqiao and Nanwan (Touwang Village, in ancient times), where leans on Shiling Mountain, passage in the east to South China Sea and adjoins the Pacific Ocean, adjacent to southwestern Asian countries. Creator's preference concentrated on her, thus the superior port came into being, thanks to Providence, then became the starting port for marine-silk-route. The county has experienced many ups and downs during its history. Plain customs and folks seem to remain. Scenery is charming. Ancient wells, commercial port and docks have testified history.

Features
Major attractions are involved with most scenic spots in 15 Townships. Of these, unique characteristics are top ten of China: the southernmost tip of mainland China; Dengloujiao Cape; the earliest starting commercial port for marine-silk-route in Han Dynasty; Coral Reefs, the largest area perfect, in China's continental shelf; the largest base for Akoya pearls culturing and manufacturing; the largest train ferry dock, North Port dock, (Opposite to South Port Dock, Hainan); the China's largest automobile ferry dock of Hai'an Port; China's largest pineapple base; the only tropical area in mainland China, where sunshine time is the longest; the China's largest galangal grow base; China's largest base for off-season bananas. Profound human civilization and scenery, landscapes, interests and ancient ruins, throw into sharp relief of Xuwen, the more lustrous pearl in South China.

Clean air, forests, flowers, tropical fruits, hills, streams, brooks, lakes, pineapple orchards, banana orchards, mango orchards, papaya orchards, strawberry orchards, coconut forest cover the red land, sunshine all year round.

Xucheng

The main town in the county is Xucheng.

Xucheng is the commercial, political, cultural, recreational and residential downtown area. Nanshan township, Chengbei township and Hai'an Township surround her. There are nine main streets: Dongfang Road, 1st, 2nd, 3rd, 4th; Dongping Road, 1 2,3,4, Hongqi Road, 1,2. Xuhai Road, Dexin Road, 1,2,3, Chengdong Avenue, Mulan Road, Wenta Road, Guisheng Road. There are two parks, two stadiums, five supermarkets, one five star hotel, one four star hotel, two 3-star hotels, four KFC style restaurants, four Classic Cantonese restaurants. 100 KTV and healthcare centers. SPA center has not been set up yet...High speed bullet train railway is being built connecting to Guangzhou. It will have been accomplished by the end of 2022.

Climate

References

County-level divisions of Guangdong
Zhanjiang